Left for Dead is the second album by Wussy, released in 2007. It was recorded by all the band's members playing together, rather than in separate tracks, resulting in what NPR described as "a meaty collection of songs with the feel of a garage band always on the verge of spinning out of control." It was chosen as the 14th greatest album of the decade by prominent critic Robert Christgau.

Track listing
"Trail of Sadness" (Cleaver, Wussy) – 2:42
"Rigor Mortis" (Walker, Wussy) – 4:02
"Mayflies" (Walker, Wussy) – 3:09
"Millie Christine" (Walker, Wussy) – 3:16
"Killer Trees" (Walker, Wussy) – 3:04
"Jonah" (Walker, Wussy) – 3:31
"What's-His-Name" (Cleaver, Walker, Wussy) – 3:59
"Tiny Spiders" (Walker, Wussy) – 5:08
"Sun Giant Says Hey" (Cleaver, Walker, Wussy) – 3:19
"God's Camaro" (Cleaver, Wussy) – 3:51
"Melody Ranch" (Walker, Wussy) – 3:09
"Vivian Girls" (Walker, Wussy) - 1:33

Personnel
Chuck Cleaver – Guitar, Vocals, Keyboards, Jaw Harp
Lisa Walker – Guitar, Vocals, Keyboards, Vibraphone, Cover Design
Mark Messerly – Bass Keyboards
Dawn Burman – Drums

References

2007 albums
Wussy albums